Portland Municipal Airport  is a city-owned, public-use airport located one nautical mile (2 km) northwest of the central business district of Portland, a city in Jay County, Indiana, United States. It is included in the National Plan of Integrated Airport Systems for 2011–2015, which categorized it as a general aviation facility.

Although most U.S. airports use the same three-letter location identifier for the FAA and IATA, this airport is assigned PLD by the FAA but has no designation from the IATA (which assigned PLD to Playa Samara, Costa Rica).

Facilities and aircraft 
Portland Municipal Airport covers an area of 45 acres (18 ha) at an elevation of 925 feet (282 m) above mean sea level. It has one runway designated 9/27 with an asphalt surface measuring 4,002 by 75 feet (1,220 x 23 m).

For the 12-month period ending December 31, 2009, the airport had 7,737 aircraft operations, an average of 21 per day: 80% general aviation, 19% military, and 1% air taxi. At that time there were 22 aircraft based at this airport: 54.5% multi-engine and 45.5% single-engine.

References

External links 
 
 Aerial image as of March 1998 from USGS The National Map
 
 

Airports in Indiana
Transportation in Jay County, Indiana